Radney Bowker (born 5 February 1979) is an English former professional rugby league footballer who played in the 1990s and 2000s.

Background
Bowker was born in Billinge, Merseyside.

References

External links
Saints Heritage Society profile
Search for "Radney Bowker" at BBC → Sport
Radney Bowker at facebook.com

1979 births
Living people
Barrow Raiders players
Halifax R.L.F.C. players
Leigh Leopards players
London Broncos players
Rugby league five-eighths
Rugby league locks
Rugby league players from Billinge, Merseyside
Salford Red Devils players
St Helens R.F.C. players